Zhao Wu (598 BCE–541 BCE), posthumously known as Zhao Wenzi (Wenzi of Zhao), was the only son of Zhao Shuo, the lord of the Zhao clan of the State of Jin during the Spring and Autumn period in ancient China. Chinese fictional folklore "The Orphan of Zhao" (趙氏孤兒) was based on Zhao Wu. He was also the inspiration of the 18th century French play L'Orphelin de la Chine.

Life 
In 583 BCE, Xianzi of Han gave his political support to Zhao Wu and made him the successor of Zhuangzi. However, Zhao Wu did not enter the aristocratic rank of Qing(卿) during the reign of Duke Li of Jin. After Duke Li's death, Duke Dao appointed Zhao Wu a Qing upon his accession. This promotion occurred in the year of 573 BCE. Since Xianzi of Han was in charge of the country, Zhao clan under Zhao Wu did not possess the regency of Jin at first.

In 560 BCE, Zhao Wu was appointed the commander of upper army of Jin with the recommendation from Xuanzi of Han. In 555 BCE, Duke Ping of Jin gathered the troops of various states and invaded the state of Qi. Zhao Wu received the order of besieging Lu (盧) with Xuanzi of Han. The Jin army was victorious. Duke Xiang of Lu rewarded Jin nobles include Zhao Wu greatly since Qi, the enemy of Lu (魯) was weakened. At this point of time, the regency of Jin was possessed by Xuanzi of Fan. In 550 BCE, Jin's civil war broke out. Luan clan was exterminated by Fan clan, its members were executed. No evidence of Zhao's participation in this civil war was found.

In 548 BCE, Zhao Wu obtained the regency of Jin. His pacifist approach weakened the tension between Jin and Chu, the two major states of Spring and Autumn period. In addition, he reduced the amount of tribute paid by minor states to Jin in order to relieve these minor states from extra financial burdens and exploitation. According to his own words, "Wars can finally come to an end". In 547 BCE, the state of Wey was in the chaos caused by a civil war. Zhao Wu met with clansmen of Sun clan which was at war with its lord, Duke Xian of Wey. With Zhao's support, Sun clan obtained sixty towns in western Wey.

In 546 BCE, Zhao Wu facilitated the truce of Mibing by collaborating with Xiang Xu and Qu Jian. During the meeting and discussions, Jin and Chu agreed to truce. Jin obtained the political supremacy over the state of Qi (齊), Chen, Cai, Bei Yan, Qi (杞), Hu, Shen, and Baidi.

In 541 BCE, Zhao Wu travelled to Guo and the state of Zheng with the purpose of strengthening the truce. Even King Jing of Zhou did not ignore the presence of Zhao Wu and sent Duke Ding of Liu to receive him.

Zhao Wu died before the year of 537 BCE. His son Zhao Cheng succeeded him. 

Throughout his life, Zhao Wu had been known as an impartial man. In his funeral, people who do not know him well attended because they received the recommendation from Zhao Wu according to their actual talent instead of their political bond with Zhao.

Reference

Sources 

Monarchs of Zhao (state)
Zhou dynasty nobility
Zhao (state)
Zhongjunjiang of Jin